Milk & Honey is a German all-female musical duo formed in 2006. It comprises former Preluders member Anne Ross ("Milk"; born 1985 in Dersum) and singer Manel Filali ("Honey"; born 1981 in Algiers). The duo is famous for their 2006 debut single "Habibi (Je t'aime)".

History 
After leaving her previous group, the pop quintet Preluders, in 2005, Anne Ross was introduced by Jörn-Uwe Fahrenkrog-Petersen to Manel Filali, and so they formed the duo Milk & Honey. They signed with Warner Music Group in 2006 and released the single "Habibi (Je t'aime)"; produced by Bülent Aris and Felix Schönewald, it mixes traditional pop music aspects with elements of oriental music.

In 2007 the duo reached higher prominence after performing at the reality show Popstars and in the German version of Come Dine with Me (entitled Das perfekte Dinner). In the same year, they released another single, "Didi", (English version of Didi); a music video for it premiered at VIVA Germany on 17 August 2007.

In 2008 the duo released their first (and so far only) studio album, Elbi, through Warner Music Group.

Discography

Albums

Singles

References 

All-female bands
German musical duos
German pop music groups
German girl groups
Musical groups established in 2006
2006 establishments in Germany